Hanka Island is a small island lying near the head of Leith Cove, Paradise Harbor, off the west coast of Graham Land, Antarctica. The name was applied by Scottish geologist David Ferguson, who visited this area in the whaler Hanka in 1913–14.

See also 
 List of Antarctic and sub-Antarctic islands

References

Islands of Graham Land
Danco Coast